A legislative assistant (LA), legislative analyst, legislative research assistant, or legislative associate, is a person who works for a legislator as a legislative staffer, in a non-partisan capacity at a think tank, research library, law library, law firm, or non-profit organization, or at a government agency as a legislative affairs professional, or in the government relations and regulatory affairs industry by monitoring pending legislation, conducting research, legislative analysis, legislative research, legal research, policy analysis, drafting legislation, giving advice and counsel, making recommendations, and performing some quasi-secretarial duties. There is a diverse array of work experiences attainable within the legislative assistance, legislative affairs, and legislative relations field, ranging between internship, entry-level, associate, junior, mid-senior, and senior level positions.

In the United States  
Members of the United States Congress (both in the House of Representatives and Senate), as well as most members of other legislative bodies of sub-national subdivisions (states, cities, counties), have multiple legislative assistants who at the basic level are tasked in handling research and briefing (both verbal briefing and written memoranda) duties while legislative assistants that are advanced in their education or careers will advise on issues related to their particular expertise (e.g. education policy, environmental policy, tax policy). Often the assignments will be connected to the committee assignments of the member. The research, think tank, and library divisions of legislative bodies, such as the Library of Congress and the Congressional Research Service at the national level also utilize legislative analysts and legislative research assistants in providing non-partisan (and at times confidential) research and advice to members of the legislature and their (immediate) staff while not working directly under the direction, supervision, or authority of the specific legislator or committee but working on behalf of the legislature as a whole in a non-partisan capacity. 

In most offices that report to a specific legislator, there is one staffer, variously called a legislative director (LD) or senior legislative assistant, who is in charge of all legislative assistants in the office. A person holding an internship level position while performing the duties of a legislative assistant is known as a legislative intern. 

Some practitioners have questioned the lack of a federal congressional clerkship program equivalent to the counterpart position of law clerk within the judiciary, finding that few top law school graduates seriously consider becoming a federal legislative lawyer (legislative attorney or legislative counsel similar to that of parliamentary counsel) working as a legislative aid with a license to practice law, a Juris Doctor (JD) degree, or comparable law school education to gain practical lawyering skills after graduation, although positions albeit not in the form of a clerkship, still exist.

Government agencies and cabinet departments in the United States have subsidiary offices of legislative affairs or congressional relations, that act as a liaison between government agencies and a legislature, to advocate on behalf of the agency, and to analyze legislation to bring the agency into compliance with new directives, laws, and regulations set forth by the legislature. Some possible positions within an "Office of Legislative Affairs," that participate in legislative assistance are legislative affairs specialists, legislative affairs analysts, congressional affairs specialists, congressional relations liaisons, legislative affairs paralegals, lawyers, and program analysts to name a few. 

The private sector and voluntary sector including both for-profit businesses and nonprofit organizations, make use of legislative assistants, legislative associates, legislative researchers, legislative paralegal specialists, or adjacent positions such as government relations specialists, specialized secretaries, program assistants, paralegals, or lawyers within their advocacy, government relations, lobbying, and regulatory affairs divisions as well as in think tanks, law firms, research libraries, and law libraries.

Career Field and Alterative Titles 
There are several subdivisions within the Legislative Assistance Career Field with a diversity of job titles as well other career fields that conduct some form of legislative assistance work.
 Legislative Assistant
 Legislative Director or Senior Legislative Assistant
 Legislative Intern
 Legislative Analyst
 Legislative Research Assistant
 Legislative Counsel, Legislative Attorney, or Parliamentary Counsel
 Legislative Affairs Specialist, Legislative Affairs Analyst, Congressional Affairs Specialist, or Congressional Relations Liaison
 Legislative Affairs Paralegal, Legislative Paralegal Specialist, Legislative Affairs Paralegal Specialist, Legislative Paralegal, Legislative Legal Assistant
 Legislative Associate
 Legislative Researcher
 Most positions in an Office of Legislative Affairs, Office of Congressional Relations, Office of Legislative Relations, or Office of Intergovernmental Relations
 Government Relations, Regulatory Affairs, Think Tanks, Policy Institutes, Law Firms, Libraries, or similar industries:
 Government Relations Specialist, Government Affairs Specialist, Government Affairs Assistant
 Secretary, Specialized Secretary, Administrative Assistant, Program Assistant, or Executive Assistant
 Paralegal, Legal Assistant, or Paralegal Specialist
 Lawyer, Attorney, or General Counsel
 Librarian, Research Librarian, Law Librarian
 Regulatory Affairs Specialist

In France 
In France, this position was formally opened after Edgar Faure visited the United States Congress in 1975. The assistants can also work on the non-legislative part of the MP job, such as managing transportation between Paris and the constituency, or handling a part of the MP's public relations.

In European Parliament 
Following his election, an MEP can submit to the European Parliament one or more application and contract for the secretarial assistance allowance. Sometimes the submission has given way to criminal prosecution of the MEP, who falsely declared the duties of the assistant or diverted part of the financial flux to himself.

References

External links
Summary of congressional staffer positions from Roll Call
Legislative Assistant Wizard (LAW) 

Legislative staff